Dieuwke IJtje Willemke de Graaff-Nauta (22 May 1930 – 10 June 2008) was a Dutch politician of the Christian Democratic Appeal (CDA) party and teacher.

De Graaff-Nauta served as member of the States of Friesland between 6 June 1962 and 14 July 1986. She was part of the executive of the province from 7 June 1982 to 14 July 1986. De Graaff-Nauta subsequently became active on the national level, where she served as state secretary for Interior between 14 July 1986 and 27 May 1994. She then became Minister and served until 22 August 1994.

On the local level she was member of the municipal council of Sneek from 6 September 1966 to 4 July 1978. Between 1 September 1970 and 7 June 1978 she concurrently served as alderman.

Decorations

References

External links

Official
  D.IJ.W. (Dieuwke) de Graaff-Nauta Parlement & Politiek

 
 

1930 births
2008 deaths
Aldermen in Friesland
Christian Democratic Appeal politicians
Christian Historical Union politicians
Commanders of the Order of Orange-Nassau
Female interior ministers
Members of the Provincial Council of Friesland
Members of the Provincial-Executive of Friesland
Ministers of the Interior of the Netherlands
Municipal councillors in Friesland
People from Sneek
State Secretaries for the Interior of the Netherlands
20th-century Dutch educators
20th-century Dutch women politicians
20th-century Dutch politicians